Kooline Station, often referred to as Kooline, is a pastoral lease that operates as a cattle station.

The property shares boundaries with Ashburton Downs, Glenflorrie, Ullawarra, Wyloo and Amelia Stations as well as vacant crown land.

In 1921 the property was owned by Mr Sanderson, Michael Corbett and his two brothers, who experienced a good season followed by a drought that broke in early 1923.

See also
List of ranches and stations

References

Pastoral leases in Western Australia
Stations (Australian agriculture)
Pilbara